Amanda Hunter may refer to:
Amanda Hunter of Hunter-Dawson State Historic Site
Amanda Hunter, character in American Yearbook
Jim Holliday, alias Amanda Hunter